Sphegina latifrons is a species of hoverfly.

Distribution
Austria.

References

Eristalinae
Diptera of Europe
Insects described in 1865
Taxa named by Theodor Becker